Bernie Morrison (born March 24, 1955, in Winnipeg, Manitoba) is a former professional Canadian football linebacker who played eleven seasons for the Calgary Stampeders of the Canadian Football League.

References

1955 births
Living people
Canadian football people from Winnipeg
Players of Canadian football from Manitoba
Canadian football linebackers
Calgary Stampeders players
Manitoba Bisons football players